Melania Corradini (born 13 April 1987 in Cles) is an Italian paralympic alpine skier.

Biography
She won a silver medal at the 2010 Winter Paralympics.

Achievements

See also
 Italy at the 2010 Winter Paralympics

References

External links
 
 

1987 births
Living people
Paralympic alpine skiers of Italy
Paralympic silver medalists for Italy
People from Cles
Medalists at the 2010 Winter Paralympics
Italian female alpine skiers
Paralympic medalists in alpine skiing
Alpine skiers at the 2010 Winter Paralympics
Sportspeople from Trentino
21st-century Italian women